Aleksandr Trifonov may refer to:
Alexandr Trifonov (born 1986), Kazakh biathlete
Aleksandr Trifonov (canoeist), Soviet sprint canoeist